The 2007 West Coast Conference men's basketball tournament took place March 2–5, 2007 at the Chiles Center on the campus of the University of Portland in Portland, Oregon. The semifinals were televised by ESPN2, and the championship game was televised by ESPN.

The top seed, Gonzaga, won the tournament for the fourth straight season, and advanced to the NCAA tournament for the 9th straight time.

Bracket

n:2007 WCC tournament

References

Tournament
West Coast Conference men's basketball tournament
College sports tournaments in Oregon
Basketball competitions in Portland, Oregon
West Coast Conference men's basketball tournament
West Coast Athletic Conference men's basketball tournament
West Coast Athletic Conference men's basketball tournament